Our Lady Derzhavnaya ("The Sovereign", "The Reigning Icon") is a Russian icon believed to date from the 18th century. According to Irina Yazykova, the Reigning Icon, "remains one of the most revered both inside Russia and in Russian emigre circles. Copies of the Reigning Icon of the Mother of God can now be found all over the world."

Origins
The icon was originally venerated in the Ascension Convent, in the Chertolye neighborhood near the Moscow Kremlin. In 1812, as Napoleon Bonaparte's Grande Armée approached Moscow during the French invasion of Russia, the icon was taken to the village church in Kolomenskoye for safekeeping and subsequently forgotten until 1917.

Reappearance
At the end of the "February Revolution" of 1917 (February in the Old Russian Calendar), on 2 March (Julian Calendar)/ 15 March (Gregorian Calendar) 1917,  Tsar Nicholas II of Russia abdicated the throne after riots in Petrograd spiraled out of control. That same day, Evdokia Adrianova, a peasant woman in the village of Pererva in Moscow Province, dreamed that the Blessed Virgin appeared and spoke to her. She was instructed to travel to the village of Kolomenskoye, where she would find an old icon which, "will change color from black to red."

Upon her arrival, the parish priest took Evdokia at her word and together they searched until they found, in an old storage room, an icon covered with candle soot. But as they took the icon outdoors, the sunlight revealed that the Mother of God was wearing the scarlet robes of a monarch. She also wore the Imperial crown and held a sceptre and globus cruciger — the symbols of regal authority.

Interpretation
According to Irina Yazykova, "Since all this took place on the same day as the Emperor's abdication from the throne, the appearance of the icon was immediately thought to be connected with that event. What is more, the priest was given to understand that the Crown that had fallen from the head of the Tsar had been taken up by the Theotokos, the Mother of God: henceforth, She would be the reigning Tsarina of the Russian State. Thus the icon was named the 'Reigning' icon and became widely revered among the Russian people"

Russian monarchists believe the reappearance of the icon  was an indication that the Virgin Mary was displeased with Russia for dethroning Tsar Nicholas II during the February Revolution. They believe that She will hold the Imperial Crown for safekeeping until the House of Romanov is restored.

In 2003 and 2014, the Reigning Icon and the Theotokos of Port Arthur icon, were brought for veneration to the Portuguese city of Fatima, where, according to Lucia dos Santos, Our Lady of Fatima predicted in 1917 that Post-Revolutionary Russia would, "spread her errors  throughout the world, causing wars and persecutions of the Church."

See also 
 Consecration of Russia
 Coronation of the Russian monarch 
 Monarchist Party
 Theotokos of Port Arthur

References 

Eastern Orthodox icons of the Virgin Mary
Russian icons
Paintings of the Madonna and Child
Lost paintings